Ariunculus speziae is a species of gastropod belonging to the family Arionidae.

The species is found in Italian Alps.

References

Arionidae
Gastropods described in 1881